Howe is a town in Le Flore County, Oklahoma, United States. It is part of the Fort Smith, Arkansas-Oklahoma Metropolitan Statistical Area. The population was 802 at the 2010 census, a gain of 15.1 percent over the figure of 697 recorded in 2000. The town was once noted for producing coal and coke, but today is chiefly supported by agriculture.

History
This community was originally a Choctaw Nation town named Klondike. After the Kansas City, Pittsburgh and Gulf Railroad laid tracks through it in 1895-6, the residents renamed it for Dr. Herbert M. Howe, a railroad director. A post office opened at Howe, Indian Territory in 1898. The Kansas City Southern Railroad bought the Kansas City, Pittsburgh and Gulf Railroad in 1900.

At the time of its founding, the community was located in the Moshulatubbee District of the Choctaw Nation.

Howe contained 626 residents in 1900, but the number declined to 538 by the 1910 census. It had grown again to 711 in 1920. The population began a long-term decline from 692 in 1930, to 640 in 1940 and to 390 in 1960. The town had its own newspaper, the Howe Herald, four doctors, four drugstores, a bank, two hotels and two cotton gins.

In 1961, a tornado hit Howe and a neighboring village (Reichert). The source calls the village Reichter, but the actual name is apparently Reichert. Some accounts even refer to the village as Richards. Thirteen people died, fifty-seven were injured and at least fifty homes were destroyed. Despite this, Howe's population trend reversed again. There were 562 residents in 1980, 697 in 2000 and 802 in 2010.

Geography
Howe is located at  (34.951369, -94.636980).

Demographics

As of the census of 2000, there were 697 people, 243 households, and 178 families residing in the town. The racial makeup of the town was 78.77% White, 0.43% African American, 8.03% Native American, 0.43% Asian, 3.59% from other races, and 8.75% from two or more races. Hispanic or Latino of any race were 4.88% of the population.

There were 243 households, out of which 35.4% had children under the age of 18 living with them, 48.1% were married couples living together, 16.9% had a female householder with no husband present, and 26.7% were non-families. 23.9% of all households were made up of individuals, and 9.5% had someone living alone who was 65 years of age or older. The average household size was 2.73 and the average family size was 3.16.

In the town, the population was spread out, with 29.3% under the age of 18, 12.1% from 18 to 24, 27.1% from 25 to 44, 21.4% from 45 to 64, and 10.2% who were 65 years of age or older. The median age was 32 years. For every 100 females, there were 109.9 males. For every 100 females age 18 and over, there were 104.6 males.

The median income for a household in the town was $25,326, and the median income for a family was $28,194. Males had a median income of $20,724 versus $19,167 for females. The per capita income for the town was $11,636. About 19.4% of families and 26.2% of the population were below the poverty line, including 29.4% of those under age 18 and 30.9% of those age 65 or over.

Economy
At the turn of the 20th century, the town economy was supported by the production of coal, coke, cotton and potatoes. The Lincoln Coal Company operated the local coal mines and also made charcoal briquettes. The Agriculture remained the mainstay of the local economy through the century. The Howe Coal Company contracted to supply Japanese steel mills with coal for 13 years, beginning in 1967.

References

External links
 Encyclopedia of Oklahoma History and Culture - Howe
 Oklahoma Digital Maps: Digital Collections of Oklahoma and Indian Territory

Towns in LeFlore County, Oklahoma
Towns in Oklahoma
Fort Smith metropolitan area